Judge & Jury is a popular novel written by thriller novel writer James Patterson with Andrew Gross. It was published in 2006 by Little Brown and Company.

Plot
It's the biggest trial of the decade - big time mobster Dominic Cavello has finally been put in the dock, and there's enough evidence to make a conviction. Heavy security surrounds the courtroom, and Nick Pellisante, the FBI agent who helped to nail Cavello, keeps a close eye on the proceedings. But things swiftly begin to go wrong. Faced with anonymous threats, the jury is sequestered. Then the bus escorting them to their hotel is bombed on the day of Andie's young son's birthday - Jarrod, who is on the bus with the rest of the jury. Andie DeGrasse is the only person who survives, her loss strengthens her resolve to see justice done, to Cavello as well as to whoever planted that bomb. She and Pellisante both know that this will be difficult, but they can't foresee just how difficult.

2006 American novels
Novels by James Patterson
Courtroom novels
Little, Brown and Company books